Baba Jiwan Singh (Gurmukhi: ਬਾਬਾ ਜੀਵਨ ਸਿੰਘ; 13 December 1661 – 22 December 1704), born Jaitha, was a Sikh general and companion of Guru Gobind Singh.

Early life

Bhai Jaita was born in 1661 at Patna, Bihar (India) to Sada Nand and mother, Mata Premo transcendence and immanence, in pantheism and nondualism. He grew up at Patna where he got training in various weapons and learned the art of warfare. In addition, he learned horse-riding, swimming, music, and Kirtan. When Sikh families staying at Patna returned to Punjab Bhai Jaita and his family went to Ramdas village and lived with Bhai Gurditta, the great-grandson of Baba Buddha. Later, Jaita married Bibi Raj Kaur, daughter of Surjan Singh.

When Guru Tegh Bahadur, the ninth guru of Sikh, was martyred by the Mughals at Chandni Chowk, Delhi, Bhai Jiwan Singh along with two other Sikhs, recovered his dismembered body from a Muslim crowd and brought it back to his son, Guru Gobind Singh. 

There after Guru Gobind honoured them with the title Mazhabi ("faithful") and said loudly, "Rangrete Guru Ke Bete"(The Rangretas are the Guru's sons) to the all Mazhabi Sikhs. After that, Bhai Jiwan Singh was instructed by his father to behead him in order to swap the head of his father for that of Guru Tegh Bahadur ji. Bhai Jiwan Singh carries out his father's wish and carried the head of Guru Tegh Bahadur from Delhi to Gobind Rai in Anandpur Sahib.

Battles and Death
Singh was with the Guru during the evacuation of Anandpur Sahib and fought the battles of Bhangani, Nadaun, Anandpur Sahib, Bajrur, Nirmohgarh, all four wars of Anandpur Sahib, Bansali/Kalmot and Sarsa.

Bhai Jiwan Singh also wrote about the exploits of Guru Gobind Singh, in his magnum opus the 'Sri Gur Katha'.

After his death in 1704 or 1705 a tomb was erected to honor him at Gurudwara Shaheed Burj Sahib at Chamkaur.

See also 

 Martyrdom in Sikhism
 Shaheed

References

External links
 Stamp Issued by India Post

Sikh martyrs
1661 births
1705 deaths
Punjabi people
People from Patna
Postage stamps of India
17th-century Indian people